Zeashta Devi Shrine or Zeathyar is Hindu shrine located in Srinagar in the Indian union territory of Jammu and Kashmir.

Gallery

See also

History of Kashmir
Exodus of Kashmiri Hindus

References

External links
Official website of Zeashta Devi Shrine  

Srinagar
Hindu temples in Jammu and Kashmir